The 1953 Titleholders Championship was contested from March 12–15 at Augusta Country Club. It was the 14th edition of the Titleholders Championship.

This event was won by Patty Berg.

Final leaderboard

External links
Youngstown Vindicator source

Titleholders Championship
Golf in Georgia (U.S. state)
Titleholders Championship
Titleholders Championship
Titleholders Championship
Titleholders Championship
Women's sports in Georgia (U.S. state)